This is a list of Sites of Community Importance in La Rioja.

See also 
 List of Sites of Community Importance in Spain

References 
 Lisf of sites of community importance in La Rioja

La Rioja (Spain)